The Musket Ball Cluster (DLSCL J0916.2+2951) is a galaxy cluster that exhibits separation between its baryonic matter and dark matter components. The cluster is a recent merger of two galaxy clusters. It is named after the Bullet Cluster, as it is a slower collision, and older than the Bullet Cluster. This cluster is further along the process of merger than the Bullet Cluster, being some 500 million years older, at 700 million years old. The cluster was discovered in 2011 by the Deep Lens Survey. As of 2012, it is one of the few galaxy clusters to show separation between its dark matter and baryonic matter components.

Characteristics
As of 2012, it is one of seven galaxy clusters that exhibit separation of dark matter and baryonic matter following cluster collision and merger. The separation between the galaxies and their dark matter components is on average . This separation may indicate that dark matter may interact with itself, through a dark force (a force that only interacts with dark matter) or a set of dark forces.

See also
 Bullet Group

Other dissociative galaxy cluster mergers known at time of discovery
 Bullet Cluster (2006)
 MACS J0025.4-1222 (2008)
 Abell 520 (2007)
 Abell 2744 (2011)
 Abell 2163 (2011)
 Abell 1759 (2011)

References

External links
 Chandra X-Ray Observatory: "Musket Ball Cluster in 60 Seconds", April Hobart, 16 April 2012 (PODcast) 

Galaxy clusters
Cancer (constellation)